Siekierkowski Bridge is a bridge over the Vistula River in Warsaw, Poland, connecting the Mokotów and Wawer districts.

When the bridge was opened on 21 September 2002 it was the newest and southernmost of Warsaw's bridges.

The bridge is named after Warsaw's Siekierki district, on the west side of the Vistula River.

See also 

Łazienkowski Bridge
Poniatowski Bridge
Świętokrzyski Bridge

References 

Bridges completed in 2002
Bridges in Warsaw
Cable-stayed bridges in Poland
Road bridges in Poland
Mokotów
Wawer
2002 establishments in Poland